Charles Josephus Nourse (June 1, 1786–March 19, 1851) was an officer in the United States Army who served as acting Adjutant General of the U.S. Army from 1822 to 1825.

Nourse was born in Brooklyn, New York on June 1, 1786.  In 1808 Nourse carried private messages to England for President James Madison.  In 1809 he was commissioned as a second lieutenant in the Army.  He was promoted to first lieutenant in 1812 and received brevets to captain (1813), and major (1814).  Nourse took part in the War of 1812 as an aide to General James Wilkinson.

Nourse served in the Army until 1827, and was acting Adjutant General from 1822 to 1825.  He resigned from the Army to become chief clerk for the Department of War and he served until he was replaced at the start of Andrew Jackson's administration in 1829.

After leaving the War Department, Nourse resided at The Highlands, his Washington, D.C. plantation.

He died in Washington, D.C., and was buried at Rock Creek Cemetery.

See also
List of Adjutant Generals of the U.S. Army

References

1786 births
1851 deaths
People from Brooklyn
American people of English descent
Adjutants general of the United States Army
United States Army officers
Burials at Rock Creek Cemetery